Just Dance 4 is a 2012 music rhythm game developed and published by Ubisoft as the fourth main installment of the Just Dance series. Announced at E3 2012 by Flo Rida and Aisha Tyler, it was released on the Wii, the Wii U, the PlayStation 3 (with PlayStation Move), and the Xbox 360 (with Kinect). The Wii, PlayStation Move and Kinect versions were released on October 2, 2012 in Europe and Australia and on October 9, 2012 in North America, The Wii U version was released on November 18, 2012 in North America and on November 30, 2012 in Europe and Australia, as a launch title for the console.

Gameplay

The gameplay remains similar to other previous Just Dance games, as players are judged on their ability to mimic on-screen dancers performing a routine to a chosen song. Karaoke-styled lyrics have been revamped, with lyrics being highlighted in a pre-set color. New features in Just Dance 4 include dance battle routines, which allows up to two teams of two to fight as one of the two dancers from two previous songs, expansions to the game's Just Sweat mode, unlockable alternate routines for songs, and a "Puppet Master" mode exclusive to the Wii U version, which allows a player to use the Wii U GamePad to serve as a "Master" to manipulate the routine and visuals, allowing them to create their own mashups by choosing any of the four dance moves from all four entries in the Just Dance series, as well as the ability to use the "Strike A Pose" mechanic, in which players will have to match the pose shown on the screen, while the "Master" has to choose which player earn a bonus of 1,000 points or decides not to award the bonus points. Previous additional modes (Simon Says Mode, Playlists, Medley, Speed-Shuffle, Just Create, and Hold My Hand (Wii, Wii U and PS3 only)) have been dropped. Additionally, the "On Fire" motive (from mostly Goods and Perfects in a row) and effort ratings have been removed, leaving only difficulty ratings and the "Gold Move" motive, which has been dropped in Mashups. The outfits and hairstyles of the dancers are now colored in a realistic style, rather than just solid colors.

Players have "Dance Quests", six missions for each song, that can be completed. Each quest nets the player Mojo points. Downloadable songs do not have dance quests. Players can also create "Dancer Cards", which can display their favorite songs, best scores, challenges, and more. Personal leaderboards are also available for the Wii version of the game.

Track list
The game features 50 songs.

Note: "Sexy and I Know It" by LMFAO was planned to be featured in the game, but was scrapped for unknown reasons. It was later brought back to Just Dance 2014 as a DLC.

Downloadable content

Wii
DLC's for Wii were available from October 18, 2012 until the closure of the Wii Shop Channel on January 30, 2019.

Xbox 360
DLC's for Xbox 360 can also be purchased from the Xbox Live Marketplace.

PS3
DLC's for PS3 are region locked (e.g., DLC's bought from US PSN Store will not work on a Region 3 disc).

Wii U
DLC's on Wii U are only available in the Nintendo eShop until its closure on March 27, 2023.

Note: "You Make Me Feel..." is only available as DLC if it has not already been unlocked with a Cheetos code of the exclusive, which had a minor adjustment between the two versions, as the Cheetos mascot, Chester Cheetah, was shown on the Cheetos version, and not on the DLC version.

Reception

Upon release, Just Dance 4 received positive reviews from video game publications. At the review aggregate websites GameRankings and Metacritic, the Wii U version of the game holds an average review score of 67.64% and 66 out of 100 respectively, the Wii version of the game holds an average review score of 72.50% and 74 out of 100 respectively, the Xbox 360 version of the game holds an average review score of 75.40% and 77 out of 100 respectively, and the PlayStation 3 version of the game holds an average review score of 77.00% and 77 out of 100 respectively.

Awards and nominations

References

2012 video games
Dance video games
Fitness games
Just Dance (video game series)
Kinect games
Music video games
PlayStation 3 games
PlayStation Move-compatible games
Ubisoft games
Wii games
Wii U games
Wii U eShop games
Xbox 360 games
Video games developed in France
Video games developed in Italy
Video games developed in Romania